The Bangladesh Export Processing Zones Authority (BEPZA) is an agency of the Government of Bangladesh and is administered under the jurisdiction of the Prime Minister's Office. Its objective is to manage the various export processing zones in Bangladesh. BEPZA currently oversees the operations of eight export processing zones (EPZ).  A ninth zone is scheduled to open in the future. Recently government has announced that in 15 years 100 new EPZ and SEZ will be established. Major General Abul Kalam Mohammad Ziaur Rahman, ndc, psc is the current Executive Chairman of BEPZA.
The Government provides numerous incentives for investors for opening factories in EPZs. For example, new factories enjoy tax holidays for 5 years. Also, labour unions and other activities that are often viewed detrimental to productivity, are banned inside the EPZs. In order to stimulate rapid economic growth of the country, particularly through industrialization, the government has adopted an 'Open Door Policy' to attract foreign investment to Bangladesh. The BEPZA is the official organ of the government to promote, attract and facilitate foreign investment in the EPZs. Besides, BEPZA as the competent Authority performs inspection & supervision of the compliances of the enterprises related to social & environmental issues, safety & security at work place in order to maintain harmonious labour-management & industrial relations in EPZs. The primary objective of an EPZ is to provide special areas where potential investors would find a congenial investment climate free from cumbersome procedures.

Export Processing Zones 
Below is the list of export processing zones run by BEPZA:

 Adamjee Export Processing Zone, Siddhirganj, Narayanganj
 Chittagong Export Processing Zone, South Halishahar, Chittagong
 Cumilla Export Processing Zone, Cumilla
 Dhaka Export Processing Zone, Savar, Dhaka
 Ishwardi Export Processing Zone, Ishwardi, Pabna
 Karnaphuli Export Processing Zone, North Patenga, Chittagong
 Mongla Export Processing Zone, Mongla, Bagerhat
 Uttara Export Processing Zone, Nilphamari
 BEPZA Economic Zone, Mirsharai, Chittagong

Newly established and proposed economic zone
Recently Government has approved 37 new Economic zones, which consists governmental, non-governmental and Specialized Economic zone. Bangladesh government also announced 50pc tax relief in Hi-Tech parks, Economic Zones.
Lakshmipur Special Economic Zone - LSEZ (Announced By PM Sheikh Hasina In 2017)   
Patuakhali Economic Zone (EPZ) - (Under construction)
Sirajgong Economic Zone (Under construction)
Bagerhat Economic Zone (Under construction)
Mirsarai Economic Zone, Chittagong (Under construction)
Anowara (Gohira) Economic Zone, Chittagong (Under construction)
Srihotto Economic Zone, Maulavibazar (Under construction)
Sripur Economic Zone (Japanese Economic Zone),Gazipur (Under construction)
Sabrang Special Economic Zone (Under construction)
Agailjhara Economic Zone, Barisal (Under construction)
Anowara Economic Zone-2, Chittagong (Under construction) named as Canadian EPZ

Jamalpur Economic Zone (Approved)
Narayangonj Economic Zone (Under construction)
Narayangonj Economic Zone-2 (Under construction
)
Ashuganj Economic Zone (Under construction)
Kushtia Economic Zone (Under construction)
Panchagar Economic Zone (Under construction)
Nilphamari Economic Zone (Under construction)
Narshingdi Economic Zone (Under construction)
Manikganj Economic Zone (Under construction)
Dohar Economic Zone, Dhaka (Under construction)
Habiganj Economic Zone (Under construction)
Shariatpur Economic Zone (Under construction)
Jaliardip Economic Zone, Teknaf-Cox's bazzar (Under construction)
Natore Economic Zone (Under construction)
Maheskhali Economic Zone-1 (Under construction)
Maheskhali Economic Zone-2 (Under construction)
Maheskhali Economic Zone-3 (Under construction)
Cox'sbazar Free trade Zone (Maheskhali)(Under construction)
Shariatpur Economic Zone-2 (Under construction)

Non-government economic zone
Government also encouraged building of private economic zone. Some are under construction and some are operational.
Meghna Industrial Economic Zone (Under Construction)
Meghna Economic Zone (Under Construction)
Fomcom non-governmental Economic Zone (Proposed)
A.K.Khan non-governmental Economic Zone (operational)
Abdul Monem Economic Zone (operational)
Comilla Economic Zone (operational)
Garments industrial park (operational)
Sonargaon Economic Zone (operational)
PowerPac Economic Zone (Mongla)

Science and technology based economic zone
Bangladesh government Establishing Science and technology based Economic zone to attract foreign FDI. Some projects like Kaliakoir high tech park helped by World bank and DFID.
Janata tower Software Park (Completed)
Jessore Software Technology Park (under construction) 
Kaliakoir high tech park (Block development ongoing)
Keranigonj Special IT Economic Zone, Dhaka (Under construction)
Dhaka high tech park (proposed)
Khulna high tech park (proposed)
Rajhshahi high tech park (Land acquiring)
Sylhet Electronic City (Under Construction)
Sylhet high tech park (Land acquiring)
Chittagong high tech park (Land acquiring)
CUET IT business incubator centre, Chittagong (under construction)
Rangpur high tech park (Land acquiring)
Barisal high tech park (Land acquiring)
Mohakhali IT Village (Land acquiring)

See also
 Special economic zone

References

External links
 Official Site
 http://nation.ittefaq.com/issues/2009/10/23/news0507.htm

Foreign trade of Bangladesh
Government agencies of Bangladesh
Special economic zones of Bangladesh
Regulators of Bangladesh